The Anti Corruption Commission (often abbreviated: ACC) is the principal government agency against corruption in Bangladesh.

History 
The Anti Corruption Commission was formed through an act promulgated on 23 February 2004 that came into force on 9 May 2004. Although initially, it could not make the desired impact, but immediately following its reconstitution in February 2007, the ACC began working with renewed vigor and impetus duly acceding to the United Nations' convention against corruption that was adopted by the General Assembly away back on 31 October 2003. Its framework and function is governed by Anti-Corruption Commission Act, 2004.

In 2009, Ghulam Rahman was appointed chairman of the commission, replacing Hasan Mashhud Chowdhury.

Anti Corruption Commission was formed through an act in 2004, but is considered to be largely ineffective in investigating and preventing corruption because of governmental control over it. The Anti-Corruption Commission of Bangladesh is crippled by the 2013 amendment of the Anti Corruption Commission Act introduced by the ruling Awami League government, which makes it necessary for the commission to obtain permission from the government to investigate or file any charge against government bureaucrats or politicians. The commission is often criticised for being ineffective and a wastage of resources due to the influence of the government over it.

In June 2013, the government appointed M Badiuzzaman chairman of Anti-Corruption Commission replacing Ghulam Rahman and Nasiruddin Ahmed was appointed commissioner.

In 2015, the ACC investigated the case of Padma Bridge Scandal. Even though the World Bank continuously pushed the government to take actions against the perpetrators, after 53 days' of investigation, ACC found nobody to be guilty. On the basis of ACC's report, Dhaka district judge court acquitted all the seven government officials who were believed to be involved in the corruption plot. Before that, ACC even exonerated Syed Abul Hossain and ex-state minister for foreign affairs Abul Hasan Chowdhury from the allegation of involvement in the corruption conspiracy.

In May 2016, Iqbal Mahmood was made chairman of Anti-Corruption Commission replacing M Bodiuzzaman and AFM Aminul Islam was appointed commissioner replacing M Shahabuddin.

Deputy Inspector General Mizanur Rahman tried to pay 4 million taka to an investigator of Anti-Corruption Commission, Director Khandaker Enamul Basir, to stop a corruption investigation against him. Rahman was convicted of trying to bribe Basir sentenced to three years imprsonment and Basir was sentenced to eight years imprisonment in the corruption case.

Organization

The commission has formulated some forms of corruption in Bangladesh, for everyone to know, understand and prepare to completely erase corruption, if not reduce it.
 Bribery: It is the offering of money, services or other valuables to persuade someone to do something in return. Synonyms: kickbacks, baksheesh (tips), payola, hush money, sweetener, protection money, boodle, and gratuity.
 Embezzlement: Taking of money, property or other valuables by the person to whom it has been entrusted for personal benefit.
 Extortion: Demanding or taking of money, property or other valuables through use of coercion and/or force. A typical example of extortion would be when armed police or military men exact money for passage through a roadblock. Synonyms include blackmail, bloodsucking and extraction.
 Abuse of discretion: The abuse of office for private gain, but without external inducement or extortion. Patterns of such abuses are usually associated with bureaucracies in which broad individual discretion is created, few oversights or accountability structures are present, as well as those in which decision-making rules are so complex as to neutralise the effectiveness of such structures even if they exist.
 Improper political contributions: Payments made in an attempt to unduly influence present or future activities by a party or its members when they are in office.

Anti Corruption Commission established district committees all over Bangladesh with each having 10 members.

Notable cases
 The Commission filed cases against former Prime Minister Khaleda Zia regarding graft at the Zia Charitable Trust and Zia Orphanage Trust.
 The Commission filed cases against former Prime Minister Sheikh Hasina and eight others on 7 May 2008 for awarding a gas exploration and extraction deal to Niko Resources through corruption and abuse of power.

References

External links
 ACC Bangladesh Official Website

Corruption in Bangladesh
Anti-corruption agencies
2004 establishments in Bangladesh
Government agencies of Bangladesh